XHALAM-FM is a noncommercial radio station on 90.7 FM in Álamo-Temapache, Veracruz. It is owned by El Aprendizaje Es Para Todos, A.C., and is part of the Radio Voces de Veracruz network of permit stations in northern Veracruz, operating as La Voz de la Huasteca.

History
XHALAM was permitted on August 1, 2012.

References

Radio stations in Veracruz